Pickard-Cambridge is a surname that may refer to:
 Sir Arthur Wallace Pickard-Cambridge (1873-1952), an English classicist
 Frederick Octavius Pickard-Cambridge (1860-1905), an English arachnologist
 Octavius Pickard-Cambridge (1828-1917), an English clergyman and naturalist

See also
Pickard
Cambridge (disambiguation)#Surnames

Compound surnames
English-language surnames